Uniquely among New Zealand rivers, the various pools and widenings of the Tongariro River and its marshy delta have been given specific names which are recognised as official by Land Information New Zealand (LINZ). The river, the main waterway of the Waikato River system above Lake Taupo in the central North Island, has over 40 named pools, the majority of which are close to the town of Turangi, at or immediately above the river's delta.

See also
List of lakes of New Zealand

References
Topographic map of Turangi and its environs, nztopomap.com.

Tongariro
Lists of landforms of New Zealand
Waikato River
Taupō District